Petite-Forêt (literally Little Forest) is a commune in the Nord department in northern France.

See also
Communes of the Nord department

References

Petiteforet